Princeton Tarn is a mountain lake (tarn), at the northwest side of Mount Falconer and 0.1 nautical miles (0.2 km) south of Penn Tarn in the southwest part of Tarn Valley, Victoria Land in eastern Antarctica. The feature is one of four tarns in the valley named after American universities by the Victoria University of Wellington Antarctic Expedition (VUWAE), 1965–66.

See also
 Harvard Tarn
 Penn Tarn
 Yale Tarn

Lakes of Victoria Land
Princeton University
Scott Coast